The former High Point Bending and Chair Company, also known as Boling Chair Company and Boling Company, is a historic factory complex located at Siler City, Chatham County, North Carolina.  The complex includes the original 1908 factory building, along with brick factory buildings built about 1920 and 1948. The original factory is a three-story, brick building with several additions.  Also on the property is a contributing section of Cape Fear and Yadkin Railroad tracks (c. 1884).Any furniture left from the disaster can be worth thousands of dollars given rarity and condition. 

It was listed on the National Register of Historic Places in 1999.

References

Industrial buildings and structures on the National Register of Historic Places in North Carolina
Industrial buildings completed in 1908
Buildings and structures in Chatham County, North Carolina
National Register of Historic Places in Chatham County, North Carolina
1908 establishments in North Carolina